Nandy Bagan or Nandi Bagan is a neighbourhood of South Kolkata in the Indian city of Kolkata in West Bengal. It is a residential area surrounded with Kasba, Haltu, Garfa, Jadavpur, Babu Bagan, Dhakuria, Naskarpara, Shahid Nagar, Bosepukur and Selimpur. It is traditionally an upper-middle-class neighbourhood, situated around the Nandi Bagan community playground. However, with the newly constructed Prince Anwar Shah Road connector with the Eastern Metropolitan Bypass, property prices have increased in the area. The area is covered by the Garfa Police Station of the Kolkata Police Force. The Haltu Post Office serves the area.

History
Nandi Bagan was a part of the early settlements of Hindu immigrants from East Bengal who were displaced from their homeland during the Bangladesh Liberation War in 1971. The area saw rapid development after the construction of a new rail over bridge (Bijon Setu) in 1978 connecting the area to Ballygunge. With the economic boom in India in 1991, the area started to attract much investment from property developers.

Neighbourhood
It is an urban middle-class neighbourhood and of late, has become a pricey area of Kolkata because of its proximity to Jadavpur, Jodhpur Park, Ballygunge and Dhakuria. The area is home to a wide variety of people from all walks of life. The roads in this neighborhood are often lined with trees. The area has a planned underground drainage system and street lighting. There are couple of parks and gardens in the area, most notably the Nandi Bagan community playground and a public swimming pool.

One of the major thoroughfares in Garfa Main Road, which connects the area to Gariahat Road and Jadavpur. It also connects the area to Prince Anwar Shah Road connector. The street has a diverse selection of restaurants, from Chinese joints to South Indian food and a wide variety of local snack-bars. Recent developments include opening of big banking outlets like State Bank of India, AXIS Bank, Allahabad Bank and Bank of India.

Transport
The area is well connected with Kolkata's bus network. Garfa Main Road is the artery of the area.

Bus

Private Bus
 1 Ramnagar - Mukundapur
 212 Howrah Station - Palbazar (Jadavpur railway station)
 SD8 Bibirhat - Nandi Bagan

Mini Bus
 S108/1 Howrah Station - Haltu P. Majumdar Road
 S108/2 Howrah Station - Safui Para
The area is also served by Auto rickshaws and Taxis. Auto rickshaws ply from Ramlal Bazaar to Fern Road and sometimes to Gariahat, on the other end from Kayastha Para to Ruby General Hospital.

Train
Ballygunge Junction railway station, Dhakuria railway station and Jadavpur railway station are the nearest railway stations.

Educational institutes
 Haltu High School for Boys
 Haltu High School for Girls
 Kids' Play House

Places of interest
Some prominent landmarks in the area include:

Residential
 B.K Tower Apartments
 Nandini Apartments
 Kheya Apartments
 Harekrishna apartments
 Nandibagan RajBari (ancestral house of the Nandis, after whom the area is named)

Commercial
 Nandibagan Community Playground
 Diagnosis & Cure Centre Laboratories
 Haltu Swimming Pool
 Flipkart Facility Hub
 Orbit Systems
 Ventor Technologies
 UMB Hall
 Allahabad Bank Kasba Branch
 SBI New Ballygunj Branch
 Bank of Baroda Ramlal Bazar Branch
 Vodafone Mini Store
 RK Photography Studio

Election results
The Councillor of Ward No: 106 is Arijit Das Thakur, belonging to the All India Trinamool Congress.

References

Neighbourhoods in Kolkata